A number of steamships were named Maria

 , a Belgian cargo ship in service during 1957
 , a Dutch cargo ship in service during 1951
 Maria (1938–1941) Danish ship ex Caravelle, ex Helga, served as USS Uranus (AF-14), returned Denmark, renamed Maria Dan then Greek Michael

Ship names